The following is a list of notable individuals who were born in and/or have lived in Everett, Washington, a major city in the Seattle metropolitan area.

Actors and actresses

 Stan Boreson, TV comedian and musician
 David L. Boushey, stuntman
 Nancy Coleman, actress
 Patrick Duffy, actor
 Peg Phillips, actress
 Michael Shamus Wiles, actor
 Cherie Witter, model and actress
 Mark L. Young, actor

Artists and authors

 Bruce Barcott, journalist and author
 Donna Barr, comic book author
 Chuck Close, painter and photographer
 David Eddings, fantasy author
 Anita Endrezze, poet and author
 James Kelsey, sculptor
 Linda Lee Cadwell, teacher, wife of Bruce Lee
 Alden Mason, painter
 James Mongrain, glass artist
 Mark P. Shea, Catholic author
 Dick Weiss, glass artist
 Hai Ying Wu, sculptor

Military and crime

 Marcus A. Anderson, Air Force lieutenant general
 Ryan G. Anderson, convicted al-Qaeda enabler
 James E. Kyes, Navy Cross recipient Commander (O-5)
 Topliff Olin Paine, airmail pilot

Musicians

 William Bolcom, pianist and composer
 Bus Boyk, fiddler
 Daniel E. Freeman, musicologist
 Carol Kaye, bass player
 Mary Lambert, singer-songwriter
 Kenny Loggins, singer-songwriter
 Perfume Genius, singer-songwriter
 Curtis Salgado, singer-songwriter
 Jason Webley, singer-songwriter

Bands

 The Moondoggies, rock band
 Parenthetical Girls, experimental pop band

Politicians and businesspeople

 Kevin Avard, state representative in New Hampshire
 Howard S. Bargreen, Washington state representative and senator
 Glenn Beck, conservative author and radio/TV host
 Jean Berkey, Washington state legislator
 Edith Bullock, businesswoman and Alaska territorial legislator
 David Marston Clough, former Minnesota Governor and politician
 JoAnn Dayton-Selman, Wyoming state representative
 Jacob Falconer, U.S. Congressman, state legislator, and Everett mayor
 William Gissberg, Washington state senator
 Don Hansey, Washington state representative
 Nick Harper, Washington state senator
 Roland H. Hartley, Washington governor
 Emil Herman, activist and political candidate
 Henry M. Jackson, U.S. Congressman and Senator
 Daniel J. Kremer, California judge
 Marko Liias, Washington state senator
 Anna Agnes Maley, journalist and political candidate
 August P. Mardesich, Washington state representative and senator
 A. L. Rasmussen, Washington state representative and senator
 Aaron Reardon, Snohomish County Executive and Washington state representative
 June Robinson, Washington state representative and senator
 Ella Russell, suffragette and political candidate
 J. H. Smith, politician and pioneer
 Michael Kelly Sutton, software engineer and journalist
 Carolyn Squires, nurse and Montana politician
 Brian Sullivan, county councilman and Washington state representative
 Elmer R. Tapper, Louisiana state representative
 Don Van Patten, New Hampshire state representative
 Larry Vognild, politician
 Monrad Wallgren, Governor, U.S. Congressman and Senator
 Jack Westland, U.S. Representative and amateur golf champion
 Emily Wicks, state representative
 Lisa Witter, entrepreneur and public speaker

Religion

 Patrick J. Conroy, Jesuit priest and Chaplain of the U.S. House of Representatives
 Vernard Eller, theologian and author

Scientists and academics

 John F. Eisenberg, zoologist
 Helen Freeman, conservationist
 Edwin Hewitt, mathematician
 Allen C. Kelley, economist
 Susan A. Martinis, biochemist
 Kent R. Weeks, Egyptologist
 Wesley Wehr, paleontologist and artist

Sportspeople

Baseball

 Rick Anderson, MLB pitching coach
 Larry Christenson, MLB pitcher
 Brent Lillibridge, MLB infielder
 Grady Sizemore, MLB outfielder
 Travis Snider, MLB outfielder
 Steven Souza, MLB outfielder
 Earl Torgeson, MLB first baseman

Basketball

 Mike Champion, NBA forward
 Boody Gilbertson, NBA player
 Nathan Mumm, minor league basketball coach and team owner of the Snohomish County Explosion
 Dan Muscatell, college basketball coach

Curling

 John Jamieson, curler

Cycling

 Tom Peterson, road racing cyclist

Football

 Tom Cable, football coach
 Chris Chandler, NFL quarterback
 Dave Christensen, college football coach
 Earl Clark, college football player and coach
 Dennis Erickson, football coach
 Rick Fenney, NFL running back
 Vern Hickey, college football coach
 Gordon Hudson, NFL tight end
 Shiloh Keo, NFL safety
 Jim Lambright, college football player and coach
 Chuck Nelson, NFL kicker
 Dave Osborn, NFL running back
 Mike Price, football coach
 Geoff Reece, NFL center
 Timm Rosenbach, college football coach
 KeiVarae Russell, NFL corner back
 Tani Tupou, XFL defensive tackle
 Abe Wilson, NFL offensive lineman

Golf

 Rex Caldwell, golfer
 Mary Bea Porter, golfer
 Anne Quast, amateur golfer

Hockey

 T. J. Oshie, NHL forward

Martial arts

 Randy Couture, mixed martial artist and UFC Hall of Fame member

Soccer

 Brady Ballew, midfielder
 Jalen Crisler, defender
 Pepe Fernández, forward for the Seattle Sounders
 Chris Henderson, midfielder
 Sean Henderson, midfielder
 Jordan Schweitzer, midfielder

Volleyball

 Kathryn Holloway, Paralympic volleyball player
 Bianca Rowland, volleyball player

Wrestling

 Craig Roberts, wrestler and Olympian

References

Everett, Washington
Everett